Stuart Wright may refer to:

 Stuart A. Wright, American sociologist
 Stuart P. Wright (1903–1982), American athlete
 Stuart Pearson Wright (born 1975), English portrait artist
 Stuart Wright (rugby league) (born 1950), English rugby player